= Bilebal =

Coordinates: 15°13′N 75°15′E

- Village
- Interactive map of Bilebal
- Country: India
- State: Karnataka
- District: Dharwad

Government
  - Body: Village Panchayat

Population (2011)
  - Total: 1,333

Languages
  - Official: Kannada
- Time zone: UTC+5:30 (IST)
- ISO 3166 code: IN-KA
- Vehicle registration: KA
- Website: karnataka.gov.in

Bilebal is a village in Dharwad district of Karnataka, India.

== Demographics ==
As of the 2011 Census of India there were 275 households in Bilebal and a total population of 1,333 consisting of 694 males and 639 females. There were 162 children ages 0–6.
